Samuel Koechlin (29 March 1925 – 25 January 1985) was a Swiss equestrian. He competed in two events at the 1956 Summer Olympics.

References

External links
 

1925 births
1985 deaths
Swiss male equestrians
Olympic equestrians of Switzerland
Equestrians at the 1956 Summer Olympics
Sportspeople from Basel-Stadt
20th-century Swiss people